Sunil Kumar Sharma is an Indian politician belonging to the Bharatiya Janata Party. He  is a member of the 18th Legislative Assembly and Sharma is considered a close aide of Uttar Pradesh Chief Minister Yogi Adityanath, Defence Minister of India Rajnath Singh, BJP'S National President J.P. Nadda with whom he had work for years. He has earlier been part of the  17th Uttar Pradesh Legislative Assembly, representing the Sahibabad constituency and elected by the largest victory margin in the 2017 and the 2022 assembly elections. In the 2022 Uttar Pradesh Legislative Assembly election he created record by winning by the highest margin ever for a candidate in a legislative assembly election in India since independence.

Political career
From 2007 to 2012, Sharma served as member of the 15th Uttar Pradesh Legislative Assembly representing the Ghaziabad constituency.

Pandit Sunil Sharma is counted as top Brahmin leader in Uttar Pradesh.

Following the 2017 assembly elections, on 11 March 2017, he was appointed Member of Legislative Assembly (MLA) for the Sahibabad constituency and joined the 17th Legislative Assembly. Sharma secured the largest victory margin of 150,643 votes in the election. 
In 2017 Sunil Sharma was appointed president of Panchayati Raj Samiti legislative assembly Uttar Pradesh (Ranked State Minister of Uttar Pradesh).

He received  votes in total, accounting for 62% of all votes polled. In the 2022 election, he won by 2,14,835 votes securing over 67% of all votes polled.

Sharma is also a member of the Bharatiya Janata Party.

Record
Sharma is listed in India Book of Records as he won the election of 2022 Legislative Assembly Uttar Pradesh as he created record by winning by the highest margin ever for a candidate in a legislative assembly election in India since independence.

Posts held

See also
Uttar Pradesh Legislative Assembly
Seventeenth Legislative Assembly of Uttar Pradesh
18th Uttar Pradesh Assembly
Bharatiya Janata Party

References

Uttar Pradesh MLAs 2017–2022
Uttar Pradesh MLAs 2022–2027
Bharatiya Janata Party politicians from Uttar Pradesh
Living people
Year of birth missing (living people)